The Hong Kong Art Craft Merchants Association was founded on 26 November 1968. Since then, membership has gone from about 180 to more than 300.

References

Culture of Hong Kong
1968 establishments in Hong Kong